Albert V. "Bud" Belan (March 7, 1930 – June 7, 2011) was a Democratic member of the Pennsylvania State Senate.

Formative years
A native of Munhall, Pennsylvania, Belan earned degrees from the University of Pittsburgh in 1966 and from Penn State University in 1967.

Public service career
A board member of the West Mifflin Area School District from 1970 to 1971, he also served as a member of the West Mifflin Borough Council from 1972 to 1976.

Belen subsequently earned his District Justice certification from the Wilson College for Minor Judiciary in 1975, and then served as a District Justice for Magisterial District 05-2-14 from 1976 through 1988.

He represented the 45th legislative district in the Pennsylvania State Senate from 1989 through 2000.

Belan died on June 7, 2011.

References

External links
 - official caucus webpage (archived)

1930 births
2011 deaths
People from Munhall, Pennsylvania
Democratic Party Pennsylvania state senators
Pennsylvania State University alumni
Pennsylvania city council members
Pennsylvania district justices
University of Pittsburgh alumni
School board members in Pennsylvania
20th-century American judges